Laurel Kent is a fictional superhero in the DC Comics universe. She first appeared in Superboy #217 (June 1976).

Fictional character biography

Original timeline
In the pre-Crisis continuity, Laurel was a candidate for membership in the Legion of Super-Heroes. As a distant descendant of Superman, she had only the power of invulnerability.

For most of her history Laurel Kent was a member of the Legion Academy training program, located at Montauk Point, where she was taught by Bouncing Boy with his wife Duo Damsel. It is here that she became friends with other Legion hopefuls, including Dawnstar (her roommate for a length of time), Jedediah Rikane, Shadow Lass' cousin Shadow Kid, and later Comet Queen.

Post-Crisis
In Legion of Super-Heroes (vol. 3) #42-#43 (January–February 1988), Laurel's original background was revealed as a fake. Instead of being a descendant of Superman, she was actually a Manhunter android from the 20th century, who had survived for a thousand years.  Her powers in this era were shown to also include flight and heat-vision. When her Manhunter programming was activated, she was tricked into believing her mission had failed so she self-destructed.

Post Zero-Hour
After Zero Hour, the Legion of Super-Heroes were rebooted and Laurel Kent was no longer an acquaintance of the group – and, in fact, it may well be that she no longer exists at all. A new character, Laurel Gand, was introduced partially to fill her role as a descendant of the 20th century inspiration of the Legion (in that new timeline, it was Valor instead of Superboy).

Post-Infinite Crisis
Some fans have speculated that in Superman/Batman #80 (March 2011), Laurel is revealed to be a member of the Superman Dynasty in the 31st century, where she operates as Superwoman, with associates including Brane Taylor and Kent Shakespeare – the Batman and Superman of that era – and Tom Wayne, the Robin from the Robin 3000 series. This speculation also assumes that she is once again going by the name "Elna", which they postulate it could be to distance herself from the Manhunter who (according to this fan theory) impersonated her. There is no published evidence to suggest that the two characters (Laurel and Elna Kent) are the same, nor is there any evidence to support the idea that there is or was, a 'real' Laurel who was impersonated by a Manhunter android.

External links
Laurel Kent Chronology at the DCU Guide
Laurel Kent at Supermanica

Characters created by Jim Shooter
Characters created by Mike Grell
Comics characters introduced in 1976
DC Comics characters with superhuman strength
DC Comics female superheroes
DC Comics robots